is a Japanese social phenomenon; part-time employees perform pranks and stunts, such as climbing into ice cream freezers, or holding their body horizontally suspended, more colloquially termed 'planking', on the counter-tops at fast-food restaurants, usually with the sole purpose of gaining recognition from their peers through the photos and/or videos they later display on social media sites. Although pranks such as the aforementioned would not be seen as shocking by many other cultures, they are considered disgraceful in Japanese culture. 

The social phenomenon emerged around the summer of 2013 , when internet-based Japanese news agencies such as Yukan-news recorded such an incident. with more traditional news agencies later following suit. In Japanese the social phenomenon is termed baito tero. The name stems from the Japanese word baito, which means "part-time job" and is a loan-word originating from the German arbeit, meaning "work".

Japanese employers are disturbed by this behavior , and penalties and punishment can range from termination of employment to a civil suit; employees, in some circumstances, can be held financially accountable for loss of business due to the negative publicity .

References

External links 

 "Part-Timers' Prank Videos: Ongoing Business Risk", a March 2, 2019 televised discussion of the topic, an episode of NHK World's Today's Close-Up programme dubbed in English

Society of Japan
Social phenomena
Practical jokes